The Woman in White is a 1948 drama film directed by Peter Godfrey which stars Alexis Smith, Eleanor Parker, Sydney Greenstreet, and Gig Young. The screenplay is based on Wilkie Collins' 1860 novel The Woman in White.

Plot
Walking late one night, Walter Hartright (Gig Young) sees a mysterious woman in white who promptly vanishes. A man in a carriage explains that a woman recently escaped from a nearby asylum. As the carriage drives by, Walter glimpses another man hidden inside. It is Count Alesandro Fosco (Sydney Greenstreet). Walter reaches his destination, which is Limmeridge House owned by the Fairlies, where he has been hired to teach drawing. There he meets the occupants: Marian Halcombe (Alexis Smith), cousin to Miss Laura Fairlie (Eleanor Parker); an elderly nurse Mrs. Vesey (Emma Dunn), and an invalid uncle, Frederick (John Abbott). He also meets a guest who has just arrived, Count Fosco. He is immediately suspicious of Fosco.

The next morning, he meets the wealthy Laura. He is stunned to see a strong resemblance to the woman in white, so much that he mistakes her for the other woman. When told the story about the mysterious woman he encountered, Marian sets out to investigate. She discovers an old letter written by Laura's mother about a distant cousin who looked much like Laura, named Anne Catherick, who came to visit one summer. Fosco steals this letter.

Laura is engaged to Sir Percival Glyde (John Emery), who comes to visit. That evening Walter meets the woman in white, Anne, crying in the garden. She says she wants to warn Laura about something, but she suddenly disappears. Walter confronts Fosco and Glyde with what Laura has told him – that they are forcing Frederick to allow Glyde to marry Laura for her fortune. Fosco and Glyde deny the charges and Marian doesn't believe him. Walter leaves Limmeridge House. Laura marries Glyde. A few months later, Marian comes back to Limmeridge House only to find all the old servants gone and new servants employed. Fosco and his wife, Countess Fosco (Agnes Moorehead) have moved in.

Fosco and Glyde find Anne (the woman in white) who suddenly dies in front of Laura and the countess, who had been poisoning her. They then fool everyone into thinking that Laura has died. Walter attends the funeral, but he realizes at once that it's Anne who is dead. He believes Laura is locked in the same asylum Anne had been. Fosco is attempting to drive Laura mad, but she escapes. She is found by Glyde, but Walter saves her, and in the scuffle, Glyde dies.

Marian wants Fosco to stop hurting Laura, as he was hypnotizing her to believe she is Anne. Marian goes to him with a bargain: if he signs a confession, and stops bothering Laura, Marian will leave the country with him. Fosco tells Marian the truth: his wife, the countess, is Fredrick's sister who had Anne out of wedlock. Fosco helped cover it up and he married the countess soon after. A year later Laura's mother had Laura.

Fosco gives some jewels that belonged to the countess, who is listening in, to Marian, and the countess further overhears that he is leaving with Marian. The countess retrieves a long dagger and stabs him to death. The police arrive just as Fosco dies and the countess retrieves the emerald necklace Fosco tormented her with. Walter narrates the ending with his marriage to Marian and the birth of a daughter. They are living with Laura and her son, and the Countess Fosco, Anne's mother, is living in the renovated asylum, along with her emerald necklace.

Cast
 Alexis Smith as Marian Halcombe
 Eleanor Parker as Laura Fairlie/Anne Catherick
 Sydney Greenstreet as Count Fosco
 Gig Young as Walter Hartright
 Agnes Moorehead as Countess Fosco
 John Abbott as Frederick Fairlie
 John Emery as Sir Percival Glyde
 Curt Bois as Louis
 Emma Dunn as Mrs. Vesey
 Matthew Boulton as Doctor Nevin
 Anita Sharp-Bolster as Mrs. Todd
 Clifford Brooke as Jepson
 Barry Bernard as Dimmock
 Creighton Hale as Underservant (uncredited)

See also
  The Woman in White – (1912)
  The Woman in White – (1929 - directed by Herbert Wilcox)

References

External links

 
 
 
 

1948 films
1948 drama films
American black-and-white films
Film noir
Films based on British novels
Films based on works by Wilkie Collins
Warner Bros. films
Films directed by Peter Godfrey
Films scored by Max Steiner
American drama films
1940s American films